Bahram (also Romanized as Bahrām; also known as Bagram and Bairam) is a village in Mishab-e Shomali Rural District, in the Central District of Marand County, East Azerbaijan Province, Iran. At the 2006 census, its population was 1,573, in 373 families.

References 

Populated places in Marand County